Yaroslav Myronovych Karabin (born 19 November 2002) is a Ukrainian professional football striker who plays for Rukh Lviv.

Career
Born in Lviv, Karabin is a product of the FC Karpaty Lviv School Sportive System, where his first trainer was Yaroslav Kikot.

In October 2020 he signed contract with another team from Lviv – Rukh, and made his debut for FC Rukh as the second half-time substituted player in the home losing match against FC Desna Chernihiv on 8 March 2021 in the Ukrainian Premier League.

References

External links
 
 

2002 births
Living people
Sportspeople from Lviv
Ukrainian footballers
Ukraine youth international footballers
Association football forwards
FC Karpaty Lviv players
FC Rukh Lviv players
Ukrainian Premier League players
Ukrainian Second League players